Ampanihy Airport  is an airport located in Ampanihy, Madagascar.

Airlines and destinations

Sources

Airports in Madagascar